Efraín Amaya (born 1959 Caracas, Venezuela) is a Venezuelan-born American composer.

Recordings
A Sense of Time
Clepsydra
"Syzygy" Music for flute 
From "Dreaming in Color"
"Pres-ent" for flute and cello

References

External links
Efraín Amaya website

1959 births
Living people
American male composers
21st-century American composers
Venezuelan composers
Male composers
21st-century American male musicians